Ion wind, ionic wind, corona wind or electric wind is the airflow induced by electrostatic forces linked to corona discharge arising at the tips of some sharp conductors (such as points or blades) subjected to high voltage relative to ground. Ion wind is an electrohydrodynamic phenomenon. Ion wind generators can also be considered electrohydrodynamic thrusters.

The term "ionic wind" is considered a misnomer due to misconceptions that only positive and negative ions were primarily involved in the phenomenon. A 2018 study found that electrons play a larger role than the negative ions during the negative voltage period. As a result, the term "electric wind" has been suggested as a more accurate terminology.

This phenomenon is now used in an MIT ionic wind plane, the first solid state plane, developed in 2018.

History 
B. Wilson in 1750 demonstrated the recoil force associated to the same corona discharge and precursor to the ion thruster was the corona discharge pinwheel. The corona discharge from the freely rotating pinwheel arm with ends bent to sharp points gives the air a space charge which repels the point because the polarity is the same for the point and the air.

Francis Hauksbee, curator of instruments for the Royal Society of London, made the earliest report of electric wind in 1709. Myron Robinson completed an extensive bibliography and literature review during the 1950s resurgence of interest in the phenomena.

In 2018, researchers from South Korea and Slovenia used Schlieren photography to experimentally determine that electrons, in addition to ions, play an important role in generating ionic wind. The study was the first to provide direct evidence that the electrohydrodynamic force responsible for the ionic wind is caused by a charged particle drag that occur as the electrons and ions push the neutral particles away.

In 2018, a team of MIT researchers built and successfully flew the first-ever prototype plane propelled by ionic wind, MIT EAD Airframe Version 2.

Mechanism 
Net electric charges on conductors, including local charge distributions associated with dipoles, reside entirely on their external surface (see Faraday cage), and tend to concentrate more around sharp points and edges than on flat surfaces. This means that the electric field generated by charges on a sharp conductive point is much stronger than the field generated by the same charge residing on a large smooth spherical conductive shell. When this electric field strength exceeds what is known as the corona discharge inception voltage (CIV) gradient, it ionizes the air about the tip, and a small faint purple jet of plasma can be seen in the dark on the conductive tip. Ionization of the nearby air molecules result in generation of ionized air molecules having the same polarity as that of the charged tip. Subsequently, the tip repels the like-charged ion cloud, and the ion cloud immediately expands due to the repulsion between the ions themselves. This repulsion of ions creates an electric "wind" that emanates from the tip, which is usually accompanied by a hissing noise due to the change in air pressure at the tip. An opposite force acts on the tip that may recoil if not tight to ground.

A vaneless ion wind generator performs the inverse function, using ambient wind to move ions, which are collected yielding electrical energy.

See also

Air ioniser
Ion thruster
Ionocraft
Plasma actuator
Hall-effect thruster
Magnetohydrodynamic drive
Magnetoplasmadynamic thruster
Pulsed inductive thruster
Field-emission electric propulsion
Spacecraft propulsion
List of plasma (physics) articles
Solid-state fan

References

External links
Plasma propulsion in space

Plasma physics
Spacecraft propulsion
Electrostatics